Shia Muslims are a minority in Singapore. Twelver Shias have been in Singapore since before the First World War. In the 1970s Rajabali Jumabhoy and his wife Fatima Premjee bought a shophouse in Lim Ah Woo Road where Muharram majaalis were addressed by Maulana Mazahir (an Urdu-language preacher from Lucknow in India).

Jaafari Muslim Association 
A Shiite association named Jaafari Muslim Association was approved in 1998. The first meeting was held on 9 January 1998 at the Imam Bargah. The founding committee members were as follows:

Ameerali Jumabhoy
Abdul Karim Sulaiman
Ahmadjirony Alap
Ali Y. Aladin
Jahari Hj. Affandi
Asad Jumabhoy
Muhammad. Ithinin Kasmin
Muhammad Said Saibon
Tayib Alias
Kassamali S. Merchant
Muhammad Nabil Abdullah Lam

References 

India
Islam in Singapore